Acid Mothers Temple & the Melting Paraiso U.F.O., commonly shortened to Acid Mothers Temple or AMT, is a Japanese rock band, the core of which formed in 1995. The band is led by guitarist Kawabata Makoto and early in their career featured many musicians and offshoot groups and collaborations, but by 2004 the line-up had coalesced with only a few core members and frequent guest vocalists.

The band has released albums frequently on a number of international record labels as well as the Acid Mothers Temple family record label, which was established in 1998 to document the activities of the whole collective.

History
Kawabata initially formed Acid Mothers Temple (originally "Acid Mother's Temple") with the intention of creating "extreme trip music" by editing and dubbing previous recordings, being influenced by progressive rock, Karlheinz Stockhausen, and krautrock. Kawabata, along with Koizumi Hajime, Suhara Keizo, and Cotton Casino formed the original Acid Mother's Temple lineup as a group; however, the first recordings released were Kawabata's own mixes and overdubs. The soul collective released two self-titled tapes on their eponymous label in 1997 before dropping the apostrophe from their name. They soon released their first self-titled album (see Acid Mothers Temple & the Melting Paraiso U.F.O.). The group began to tour overseas in 1998.

The soul collective continued to tour and record, adding to the lineup drummer Ichiraku Yoshimitsu and guitarist Higashi Hiroshi. Several non-Acid Mothers shootoff bands formed, including Floating Flower, Nishinihon, and Tsurbami, while The Melting Paraiso U.F.O. played at sold-out shows and festivals all over North America, Japan, and Europe in the 2000s (decade). In 2002, the soul collective released four albums and two EPs in a three-month span while touring the United States, the United Kingdom, and Ireland, including South by Southwest in Austin, being selected as one of the top three groups performing.

Kawabata began his own solo offshoot, called Kawabata Makoto & the Mothers of Invasion, in an attempt to create music with a more jazz feel. In 2002, along with Tsuyama Atsushi and Ichiraku Yoshimitsu, the group released their only album under this name.

In 2003, an incarnation of the soul collective called "Acid Mothers Temple mode HHH" was formed to tour Europe, consisting of Kawabata, Tsuyama, and Yoshida, a group who had played together as Seikazoku long before Acid Mothers Temple was formed. The same year, a collaboration of Acid Mothers Temple and Gong called "Acid Mothers Gong" performed at the Royal Festival Hall in London.

Soon after, in 2004, long-time vocalist and synthesizer player Cotton Casino left the group to concentrate on her own group and family while Acid Mothers Gong continued to tour. The group again released four albums in a three-month period, while another collaboration between Acid Mothers Temple and Afrirampo, Acid Mothers Afrirampo, released an album as well. Meanwhile, Acid Mothers Temple mode HHH renamed itself to Acid Mothers Temple SWR and released its own album.

In 2005, to commemorate the tenth anniversary of Acid Mothers Temple, a new group called Acid Mothers Temple & the Cosmic Inferno was formed, starting their first European tour in June, and consisting of Kawabata, Higashi Hiroshi, Tabata Mitsuru, Okano Futoshi, and Shimura Koji and releasing several albums. Acid Mothers Temple SWR continued to tour as well. Acid Mothers Temple & the Incredible Strange Band was formed in 2006 by Tsuyama Akiko, Suhara Keizo, Aiko, Tsuyama Atsushi, and Kawabata Makoto. Kitagawa Hao joined The Cosmic Inferno as vocalist, though she left the soul collective after touring the United States in mid-2007. Tsuyama and Kawabata formed another offshoot in December 2006, Acid Gurus Temple, with Mani Neumeier of Guru Guru, which quickly changed its name to Acid Mothers Guru Guru.

The soul collective has also hosted its own yearly festival in Japan, appropriately titled Acid Mothers Festival, since 2002, which has been attended by Yamazaki Maso of Masonna, Afrirampo, Yoshida Tatsuya, Mani Neumeier, Kuriyama Jun, Ohpia, and Seiichi Yamamoto of Boredoms.

During their first Southamerican Tour in 2017 Acid Mothers Temple & the Melting Paraiso U.F.O. met Argentine cult band Reynols. In Buenos Aires both groups went to a Studio to record together. In 2020 the album ACID MOTHERS REYNOLS "Vol.1" was released as LP by French label La Belle Brute and the same year the film "Acid Mothers Reynols: Live and Beyond" was presented documenting this historic meeting.

Acid Mothers Temple & the Melting Paraiso U.F.O. traditionally tour Canada and the United States in the spring of every year, on a grueling schedule with very few days off, and continued this through 2019.  Somewhat less frequently, they tour Europe in the autumn.

With regards to the often-confusing array of names for the different bands, Kawabata has explained:

One reviewer said of Acid Mothers Temple & the Melting Paraiso U.F.O. concerts:

Discography

Members

References

External links
Official website
Official Facebook
Official Twitter
Acid Mothers Temple collection at the Internet Archive's live music archive
Acid Mothers Temple @ HearJapan

Alien8 Recordings artists
Important Records artists
Japanese psychedelic rock music groups
Musical groups established in 1995
P.S.F. Records artists
Space rock musical groups
Tumult Records artists